C. ferruginea may refer to:
 Calidris ferruginea, the curlew sandpiper, a small wader species which breeds on the tundra of Arctic Siberia
 Cleopatra ferruginea, a freshwater snail species
 Cnestis ferruginea, a shrub species native to Africa
 Cyathea ferruginea, a tree fern species native to the islands of Negros, Palawan and Balabac
 Cyanea ferruginea, the pacific lion's mane, a jellyfish species

Synonyms
 Calandra ferruginea, a synonym for Rhynchophorus ferrugineus, the red palm weevil, an insect species
 Correa ferruginea, a synonym for Correa lawrenceana, a small tree species endemic to Australia
 Chrysocoma ferruginea, a synonym for Ozothamnus ferrugineus, a small tree species native to New South Wales, Victoria and Tasmania in Australia

See also
 Ferruginea (disambiguation)